Antonio Jeremiah "Tony" Leone Larios (born April 28, 2004) is a professional footballer who plays as a centre-back for Major League Soccer club Los Angeles FC. Born in the United States, he represented the Mexico national under-20 team.

Club career
Born in Long Beach, California, Leone began his career with Total Futbol Academy before joining the youth setup of Major League Soccer club Los Angeles FC. Leone rose through the ranks of the club before signing a professional homegrown player contract alongside fellow Mexican-American teammates Christian Torres and Erik Dueñas on July 8, 2020.

Las Vegas Lights (loan) 
On May 22, 2021, Leone was loaned out to Los Angeles FC's USL Championship affiliate Las Vegas Lights for their match against Phoenix Rising. He made his debut in the match, starting for Las Vegas in the 1–5 defeat. August 27, 2021, Leone received his first red card of his career against LA Galaxy II in the 90th+2 minute.

International career
Leone is eligible to play for the United States or Mexico. He has represented the United States at both the under-15 and under-17 levels, and Mexico at the under-15, under-17, under-19 and under-20.

Leone was called up to the Mexico U-20 team by Luis Ernesto Pérez to participate at the 2021 Revelations Cup, appearing in three matches, where Mexico won the competition. The following year, he was subsequently called up again to the Mexico U-20 team for the 2022 CONCACAF U-20 Championship, in which Mexico failed to qualify for the FIFA U-20 World Cup and Olympics.

Career statistics

Club

Honours
Mexico U20
Revelations Cup: 2021

Individual
CONCACAF U-20 Championship Best XI: 2022

References

External links
 Profile at Los Angeles FC

2004 births
Living people
Soccer players from Los Angeles
Mexican footballers
Mexico under-20 international footballers
Mexico youth international footballers
American soccer players
United States men's youth international soccer players
American sportspeople of Mexican descent
Association football defenders
Homegrown Players (MLS)
Las Vegas Lights FC players
Los Angeles FC players
USL Championship players